This is a list of the mammal species recorded in Canada. There are approximately 200 mammal species in Canada. Its large territorial size consist of fifteen terrestrial and five marine ecozones, ranging from oceanic coasts, to mountains to plains to urban housing, mean that Canada can harbour a great variety of species, including nearly half of the known cetaceans.  The largest marine ecozone is the Arctic Archipelago whereas the terrestrial ecozone is the Boreal Shield. The most well represented order is that of the rodents, and the smallest that of the Didelphimorphia (common opossums).

Studies of mammals in Canada hearken back to the 1795 northern explorations of Samuel Hearne, whose account is considered surprisingly accurate. The first seminal work on Canadian mammals, however, was John Richardson's 1829 Fauna Boreali-Americana. Joseph Burr Tyrrell was the first to attempt to produce, in 1888, a comprehensive list of Canadian mammalian species. Ernest Thompson Seton and Charles-Eusèbe Dionne's work were also important. Modern Canadian publications with interest in mammalogy include The Canadian Field-Naturalist, the Canadian Journal of Zoology and the French-language Le Naturaliste Canadien.

Several species of mammal have particular symbolism. The Canadian horse and North American beaver are official symbols of Canada, and several provinces have designated native species as symbols.

Conservation status - IUCN Red List of Threatened Species:
 - Extinct,  - Extinct in the Wild
 - Critically Endangered,  - Endangered,  - Vulnerable
 - Near Threatened,  - Least Concern
 - Data Deficient,  - Not Evaluated
(v. 2013.2, the data is current as of March 5, 2014)

Native mammals

Bats 

Bats most distinguishing feature is that their forelimbs are developed as wings, making them the only mammals capable of flight. Bat species account for about 20% of all mammals.

Carnivorans 
Carnivorans include over 260 species, the majority of which eat meat as their primary dietary item. They have a characteristic skull shape and dentition.

Cetaceans 

Cetaceans includes whales, dolphins and porpoises. They are the mammals most fully adapted to aquatic life with a spindle-shaped nearly hairless body, protected by a thick layer of blubber, and forelimbs and tail modified to provide propulsion underwater.

Even-toed ungulates 

The even-toed ungulates are ungulates whose weight is borne about equally by the third and fourth toes, rather than mostly or entirely by the third as in perissodactyls. There are about 220 artiodactyl species worldwide, including many that are of great economic importance.

Marsupials 

Didelphimorphia is the order of common opossums of the Western Hemisphere. Opossums probably diverged from the basic South American marsupials in the late Cretaceous or early Paleocene. They are small to medium-sized marsupials, about the size of a large house cat, with a long snout and prehensile tail.

Rabbits, hares, and pikas 

The lagomorphs comprise two families, Leporidae (hares and rabbits), and Ochotonidae (pikas). They can resemble rodents, but differ in a number of physical characteristics, such as having four incisors in the upper jaw rather than two.

Rodents 

Rodents make up the largest order of mammals, with over 40% of mammalian species. They have two incisors in the upper and lower jaw which grow continually and must be kept short by gnawing. Most rodents are small though the capybara, a rodent native to South America, can weigh up to 45 kg (100 lb).

Shrews and moles 

Eulipotyphlans are insectivorous mammals. Shrews and solenodons closely resemble mice, hedgehogs carry spines, while moles are stout-bodied burrowers.

Introduced or accidental species
A number of wild mammals may be found in Canadian territory without being confirmed natives. Some were voluntarily or involuntarily introduced. These include the house mouse (Mus musculus), and brown and black rats (respectively Rattus norvegicus and R. rattus). Other include escaped animals: the coypu (Myocastor coypus), European rabbit (Oryctolagus cuniculus) and European hare (Lepus europaeus). Both the European fallow deer (Dama dama) and wild boar (Sus scrofa) were introduced for hunting.

Finally, other species are encountered only accidentally, or so rarely in Canadian territory that it is impossible to tell whether they are permanent residents. Most of these species are cetaceans, some generally poorly known: Risso's dolphin (Grampus griseus), the dwarf and pygmy sperm whales (Kogia sima and K. breviceps), Blainville's and True's beaked whale (Mesoplodon densirostris and M. mirus), the false killer whale (Pseudorca crassidens), and the striped dolphin (Stenella coeruleoalba). The big free-tailed and evening bats (respectively Nyctinomops macrotis and Nycticeius humeralis), as well as the New England cottontail (Sylvilagus transitionalis) are found mostly in areas south of the U.S.-Canada frontier, and occasionally in Canada.

Extinct, extirpated or reintroduced species
Out of three species that have been extirpated in Canada in written history, two have since been reintroduced.

The sea mink (Neogale macrodon) formerly lived in the Maritime Provinces, but became extinct following overhunting and habitat destruction. The only Canadian (and also last known) specimen was captured on Campobello Island, New Brunswick in 1894.

The eastern elk (Cervus canadensis canadensis), a subspecies of the elk or wapiti, was also formerly found in Quebec and Ontario, but was made extinct for much the same reasons as the sea mink.

Eastern cougars (Puma concolor couguar) were also found in the eastern provinces, but became extinct soon after populations in the United States were eradicated.

The black-footed ferret (Mustela nigripes) became extirpated in Canada in 1937. Between the 1950s and 1981, it was suspected to be entirely extinct until a wild population was discovered in 1981 in Wyoming. Subsequent reintroductions into Canada have failed.

The swift fox (Vulpes velox) and sea otter (Enhydra lutris) both were extirpated in Canada in the 1930s, but were successfully reintroduced in the beginning of the 1970s.

See also
Fauna of Canada
List of mammals of the United States
List of mammals of North America
Lists of mammals by region
List of prehistoric mammals

Notes

A Banfield, Mammals of Canada, pp. xiv-xv.
B National Symbol of Canada Act 1985 R.S.C., c. N-17: "the Beaver (Castor canadensis) is a symbol of the sovereignty of Canada". National Horse of Canada Act 2002 S.C. 2002, c. 11.

References

Sources

Further reading

External links
Databases: Division of Mammals: Department of Vertebrate Zoology: NMNH - i.e. printable Field Guide to mammals of North America
Mammal Species of the World, 3rd edition (MSW3) - database of mammalian taxonomy
IUCN Red List of Threatened Species